Lost Society is a Finnish  metal band from Jyväskylä, formed in 2010. The band's current lineup consists of guitarist and lead vocalist Samy Elbanna, guitarist and backing vocalist Arttu Lesonen, bassist and backing vocalist Mirko Lehtinen, and drummer Taz Fagerström.

History
The band participated in the 2012 band contest GBOB (Global Battle of the Bands) organized by Nuclear Blast, eventually winning the contest as the Finnish qualifier, and came to London to perform in the finals. In 2013, they released their debut album Fast Loud Death and received a positive response from the Finnish media. The band toured with Children of Bodom in late 2013.

In April 2014, the band released their second studio album, Terror Hungry, which charted at number 6 on the official Finnish charts (Suomen virallinen lista). Compared to its predecessor, the album had more groove metal-inspired riffs.

In February 2016, the band released their third album, Braindead, which rose to number 3 on the official chart. In relation to their earlier productions, the album is slower and has, on average, longer songs.

The band appeared at the Hartwall Arena on December 7, 2015, alongside Slayer and Anthrax. In early 2016, they toured with American thrash metal band Exodus in European countries including England, Ireland, Germany, and the Netherlands.

On February 19, 2020, two days before the release of their fourth album, it was announced that Ossi Paananen would be stepping down as the band's drummer and would be replaced by former Santa Cruz drummer Taz Fagerström. Their fourth album, No Absolution, was released on February 21, 2020. On March 3, 2020, the album reached the Finnish charts landing at number 4.

On May 18, 2022 the band released a new single called 112. The single is part of their fifth album called If the Sky Came Down. The album was released on October 7, 2022.

Musical style 
Lost Society was initially considered a thrash metal band. In their first two albums, Fast Loud Dead (2013) and Terror Hungry (2014), they delivered fast and raw thrash metal with aggressive and party-themed lyrics often revolving around alcohol consumption. Their style started to change in their third album, Braindead (2016). While Braindead is still considered a thrash metal album, the band started incorporating elements of groove metal and metalcore to their music and most of the lyrics started to shift to other topics rather than partying and binge drinking. This trend became more evident in their fourth album, No Absolution (2020), in which the band completely moved away from thrash metal. No Absolution can be classified as a metalcore album with strong groove metal elements. The lyrics in No Absolution focus on religion and its negative influence on people and society. Their fifth album If The Sky Came Down (2022) has shown the fans a more modern musical style. If The Sky Came Down is a metalcore-based album with a strong  nu metal influence and elements of hard rock and groove metal. The lyrics in their fifth album have angsty and existential dread themes.

Band members 

Current members
Samy Elbanna – lead and rhythm guitars, lead vocals (2010–present)
Arttu Lesonen – lead and rhythm guitars, backing vocals (2011–present)
Mirko Lehtinen – bass guitar, backing vocals (2011–present)
Taz Fagerström – drums (2020–present)

Past members
Ossi Paananen – drums (2011–2020)

Discography

Studio albums 
Fast Loud Death (2013)
Terror Hungry (2014)
Braindead (2016)
No Absolution (2020)
If the Sky Came Down (2022)

Singles 
"Trash All Over You" (2013)
"I Am the Antidote" (2015)
"No Absolution" (2019)
"Deliver Me" (2019)
"Into Eternity" (2019)
"Artificial" (2020)
"112" (2022)
"Stitches" (2022)
"What Have I Done" (2022)
"Awake" (2022)

Demos 
Lost Society (2011)
Trash All Over You (2012)

References

External links 

Official Website

Website description sheet on metal-archives.com

2010 establishments in Finland
Crossover thrash groups
English-language singers from Finland
Finnish thrash metal musical groups
Groove metal musical groups
Musical groups established in 2010
Musical quartets
Nuclear Blast artists